Taimi Piin-Aaspõllu (3 September 1940 – 2 September 2012) was an Estonian mycologist.

She has described the following taxon:
 Biatorella contigua N.S.Golubk. & Piin

References

1940 births
2012 deaths
Estonian mycologists
University of Tartu alumni
Recipients of the Order of the National Coat of Arms, 5th Class
Burials at Rahumäe Cemetery